OXB may refer to :
 Ocean City Municipal Airport (Maryland)
 Osvaldo Vieira International Airport (Guinea-Bissau)
 Oxford BioMedica London Stock Exchange symbol OXB